Sørreisa Church or Tømmervik Church is a parish church of the Church of Norway in Sørreisa Municipality in Troms og Finnmark county, Norway. It is one of the churches for the Sørreisa parish which is part of the Senja prosti (deanery) in the Diocese of Nord-Hålogaland. The white, wood and steel church was built in a square-shaped design in 1992 using plans drawn up by the architect Viggo Ditlefsen. The church seats about 300 people.

History
The original church in Sørreisa was built on this site in 1844. The church building was octagonal and it was designed by the architect Christian H. Grosch. That church building burned down in 1987 and a new church was built on the same site in 1992. The new church is a square-shaped church that is larger than the old church. The interior of the new church has an octagonal-shaped sanctuary in the center of the square building that corresponds the outline of the old church. Surrounding the sanctuary are overflow rooms, a sacristy, and bathrooms.

Media gallery

See also
List of churches in Nord-Hålogaland

References

External links
Floorplan of the church

Sørreisa
Churches in Troms
20th-century Church of Norway church buildings
Churches completed in 1992
1844 establishments in Norway
Rectangular churches in Norway